António Martins (born 10 July 1930) is a Portuguese former sports shooter. He competed in the 25 metre pistol event at the 1960 Summer Olympics. His father also represented Portugal at the Olympics as a sports shooter.

References

1930 births
Living people
Portuguese male sport shooters
Olympic shooters of Portugal
Shooters at the 1960 Summer Olympics
Sportspeople from Lisbon